Georg Bertil Tallberg (born 6 April 1961 in Helsinki) is a Finnish competitive sailor and Olympic medalist. He is married to Anna Slunga-Tallberg.

Tallberg won a bronze medal in the 470 class at the 1980 Summer Olympics in Moscow, along with his partner Jouko Lindgrén.

References

External links

1961 births
Living people
Finnish male sailors (sport)
Sailors at the 1980 Summer Olympics – 470
Olympic sailors of Finland
Olympic bronze medalists for Finland
Olympic medalists in sailing
Medalists at the 1980 Summer Olympics
Sportspeople from Helsinki